Monterey Historic District is a national historic district located in  Washington Township, Franklin County, Pennsylvania. The district includes 60 contributing buildings associated with a late-19th century summer resort community, developed primarily after 1885. The residential buildings include several high-styled Late Victorian, Georgian Revival, and Colonial Revival style cottage dwellings.  Notable buildings include "Alfheim," "Red House," "Bramble Bush," "Pink Shutters," "Charmian Manor," Pittman House, Greystone Inn (c. 1850), Valore House (1895), Hawley Church, Dunbrack Library (c. 1894), Dunbrack Inn, and Dunbrack Stables (c. 1880).

It was listed on the National Register of Historic Places in 1976.

References 

Historic districts on the National Register of Historic Places in Pennsylvania
Georgian Revival architecture in Pennsylvania
Colonial Revival architecture in Pennsylvania
Houses in Franklin County, Pennsylvania
National Register of Historic Places in Franklin County, Pennsylvania